The Turks and Caicos FA Cup is an association football cup tournament held for domestic league clubs in the Turks and Caicos Islands. It is overseen by Turks and Caicos Islands Football Association. There are seven teams that compete in the cup competition every season.

References 

Football competitions in the Turks and Caicos Islands